Una Lady Como Tú is a song by the Colombian singer Manuel Turizo released in 2016.

Background
"Una Lady Como Tú" was written by Christian Mena, Manuel Turizo, Julian Turizo, Santiago Mesa and Carlos Cassio.

Commercial performance
In Europe, "Una Lady Como Tú" peaked the number two in Spain, In Italy, the song peaked the number 58.

In Latin America, the song topped the charts of El Salvador and Paraguay, reached top 5 in Bolivia, Chile, Colombia, Costa Rica, Ecuador, Honduras, Mexico, Nicaragua, Panama and Peru and reached top 20 in Argentina, and Dominican Republic.

In the United States, "Una Lady Como Tú" received a 8x Latin platinum certification by the Recording Industry Association of America (RIAA) on April 25, 2019, for units of over 480,000 sales plus track-equivalent streams. It was also received four platinum by the Spanish Music Producers (PROMUSICAE), platinum by Federazione Industria Musicale Italiana (FIMI) and a double diamond+platinum+gold certification by Asociación Mexicana de Productores de Fonogramas y Videogramas (AMPROFON).

Music video
"Una Lady Como Tú" was released on Manuel Turizo YouTube channel on March 16, 2017. As in August 2021, the song surpassed 1.5 billion views.

Charts

Year-end charts

Certifications

References

2016 songs
2017 singles
Manuel Turizo songs
Spanish songs